The Lord of the Rings: The Fellowship of the Ring is a 2001 epic fantasy adventure film directed by Peter Jackson from a screenplay by Fran Walsh, Philippa Boyens, and Jackson, based on 1954's The Fellowship of the Ring, the first volume of the novel The Lord of the Rings by J. R. R. Tolkien. The film is the first installment in The Lord of the Rings trilogy. It features an ensemble cast including Elijah Wood, Ian McKellen, Liv Tyler, Viggo Mortensen, Sean Astin, Cate Blanchett, John Rhys-Davies, Billy Boyd, Dominic Monaghan, Orlando Bloom, Christopher Lee, Hugo Weaving, Sean Bean, Ian Holm, and Andy Serkis.

Set in Middle-earth, the story tells of the Dark Lord Sauron, who seeks the One Ring, which contains part of his might, to return to power. The Ring has found its way to the young hobbit Frodo Baggins. The fate of Middle-earth hangs in the balance as Frodo and eight companions (who form the Fellowship of the Ring) begin their journey to Mount Doom in the land of Mordor, the only place where the Ring can be destroyed. The Fellowship of the Ring was financed and distributed by American studio New Line Cinema, but filmed and edited entirely in Jackson's native New Zealand, concurrently with the other two parts of the trilogy. 

It premiered on 10 December 2001 at the Odeon Leicester Square in London, and was then released on 19 December in the United States and on 20 December in New Zealand. The film was acclaimed by critics and fans alike, who considered it to be a landmark in filmmaking and an achievement in the fantasy film genre. It received praise for its visual effects, performances, Jackson's direction, screenplay, musical score, and faithfulness to the source material. It grossed over $880 million worldwide in its initial release, making it the second highest-grossing film of 2001 and the fifth highest-grossing film of all time at the time of its release. Following subsequent reissues, it has as of 2021 grossed over $898 million. Like its successors, The Fellowship of the Ring is widely recognized as one of the greatest and most influential films ever made. The film received numerous accolades; at the 74th Academy Awards, it was nominated for thirteen awards, including Best Picture, winning for Best Cinematography, Best Makeup, Best Original Score, and Best Visual Effects.

In 2007, the American Film Institute named it one of the 100 greatest American films in history, being both the most recent film and the only film released in the 21st century to make it to the list. In 2021, the film was selected for preservation in the United States National Film Registry by the Library of Congress for being "culturally, historically, or aesthetically significant". Two sequels, The Two Towers and The Return of the King, followed in 2002 and 2003, respectively.

Plot

In the Second Age of Middle-earth, the lords of Elves, Dwarves, and Men are given Rings of Power. Unbeknownst to them, the Dark Lord Sauron forges the One Ring in Mount Doom, instilling into it a great part of his power, to dominate the other Rings to conquer Middle-earth. A final alliance of Men and Elves battles Sauron's forces in Mordor. Isildur of Gondor severs Sauron's finger and the Ring with it, thereby vanquishing Sauron and returning him to spirit form. With Sauron's first defeat, the Third Age of Middle-earth begins. The Ring's influence corrupts Isildur, who takes it for himself and is later killed by Orcs. The Ring is lost in a river for 2,500 years until it is found by Gollum, who owns it for over four and a half centuries. The ring abandons Gollum and it is subsequently found by a hobbit named Bilbo Baggins, who is unaware of its history.

Sixty years later, Bilbo celebrates his 111th birthday in the Shire, reuniting with his old friend, the wizard Gandalf the Grey. Bilbo departs the Shire for one last adventure, and he leaves his inheritance, including the Ring, to his nephew Frodo. Gandalf investigates the Ring, discovers its true nature, and learns that Gollum was captured and tortured by Sauron's Orcs, revealing two words during his interrogation: "Shire" and "Baggins." Gandalf returns and warns Frodo to leave the Shire. As Frodo departs with his friend, gardener Samwise Gamgee, Gandalf rides to Isengard to meet with the wizard Saruman, but discovers his betrayal and alliance with Sauron, who has dispatched his nine undead Nazgûl servants to find Frodo.

Frodo and Sam are joined by fellow hobbits Merry and Pippin, and they evade the Nazgûl before arriving in Bree, where they are meant to meet Gandalf. However, Gandalf never arrives, having been taken prisoner by Saruman. The hobbits are then aided by a Ranger named Strider, who promises to escort them to Rivendell; however, they are ambushed by the Nazgûl on Weathertop, and their leader, the Witch-King, stabs Frodo with a Morgul blade. Arwen, an Elf and Strider's beloved, locates Strider and rescues Frodo, summoning flood-waters that sweep the Nazgûl away. She takes him to Rivendell, where he is healed by the Elves. Frodo meets with Gandalf, who escaped Isengard on a Great Eagle. That night, Strider reunites with Arwen, and they affirm their love for each other.

Learning of Saruman's betrayal from Gandalf and now realizing that they are facing threats from both Sauron and Saruman, Arwen's father, Lord Elrond, decides against keeping the Ring in Rivendell. He holds a council of Elves, Men, and Dwarves, also attended by Frodo and Gandalf, that decides the Ring must be destroyed in the fires of Mount Doom. Frodo volunteers to take the Ring, accompanied by Gandalf, Sam, Merry, Pippin, Elf Legolas, Dwarf Gimli, Boromir of Gondor, and Strider—who is actually Aragorn, Isildur's heir and the rightful King of Gondor. Bilbo, now living in Rivendell, gives Frodo his sword Sting, and a chainmail shirt made of mithril.

The Fellowship of the Ring makes for the Gap of Rohan, but discover it is being watched by Saruman's spies. They instead set off over the mountain pass of Caradhras, but Saruman summons a storm that forces them to travel through the Mines of Moria. After finding the Dwarves of Moria dead, the Fellowship is attacked by Orcs and a cave troll. They hold them off but are confronted by Durin's Bane: a Balrog residing within the mines. While the others escape, Gandalf fends off the Balrog and casts it into a vast chasm, but the Balrog drags Gandalf down into the darkness with him. The devastated Fellowship reaches Lothlórien, ruled by the Elf-queen Galadriel, who privately informs Frodo that only he can complete the quest and that one of the Fellowship will try to take the Ring. She also shows him a vision of the future in which Sauron succeeds in enslaving Middle-earth, including the Shire. Meanwhile, Saruman creates an army of Uruk-hai in Isengard to find and kill the Fellowship.

The Fellowship travels by river to Parth Galen. Frodo wanders off and is confronted by Boromir, who, as Lady Galadriel had warned, tries to take the Ring. Uruk-hai scouts then ambush the Fellowship; their leader, Lurtz, mortally wounds Boromir as he fails to stop them from taking Merry and Pippin as prisoners. Aragorn arrives and kills Lurtz before comforting Boromir as he dies, promising to help the people of Gondor in the coming conflict. Fearing the Ring will corrupt his friends, Frodo decides to travel to Mordor alone, but allows Sam to come along, recalling his promise to Gandalf to look after him. As Aragorn, Legolas, and Gimli set out to rescue Merry and Pippin, Frodo and Sam make their way down the mountain pass of Emyn Muil, journeying on to Mordor.

Cast

Before filming began on 11 October 1999, the principal actors trained for six weeks in sword fighting (with Bob Anderson), riding and boating. Jackson hoped such activities would allow the cast to bond so chemistry would be evident on screen as well as getting them used to life in Wellington. They were also trained to pronounce Tolkien's verses properly. After the shoot, the nine cast members playing the Fellowship got a tattoo, the Elvish symbol for the number nine, with the exception of John Rhys-Davies, whose stunt double got the tattoo instead. The film is noted for having an ensemble cast, and some of the cast and their respective characters include:
 Elijah Wood as Frodo Baggins: A young hobbit who inherits the One Ring from his uncle Bilbo. Wood was the first actor to be cast on 7 July 1999. Wood was a fan of the book, and he sent in an audition dressed as Frodo, reading lines from the novel. Wood was selected from 150 actors who auditioned. Jake Gyllenhaal unsuccessfully auditioned for the role.
 Ian McKellen as Gandalf the Grey: An Istari wizard and mentor to Frodo. Sean Connery was approached for the role, but did not understand the plot, while Patrick Stewart turned it down as he disliked the script. Patrick McGoohan was also offered the role, but turned it down due to health issues. Christopher Plummer also turned down the role. Sam Neill was also offered the role but declined due to his scheduling conflict with Jurassic Park III. Before being cast, McKellen had to sort his schedule with 20th Century Fox as there was a two-month overlap with X-Men. He enjoyed playing Gandalf the Grey more than his transformed state in the next two films, and based his accent on Tolkien. Unlike his on-screen character, McKellen did not spend much time with the actors playing the Hobbits; instead he worked with their scale doubles.
 Viggo Mortensen as Aragorn: A Dúnedain ranger and heir to Gondor's throne. Daniel Day-Lewis was offered the part at the beginning of pre-production, but turned it down. Nicolas Cage also received an offer, declining because of "family obligations", while Vin Diesel, a fan of the book, auditioned for Aragorn. Stuart Townsend was cast in the role, before being replaced during filming when Jackson realised he was too young. Russell Crowe was considered as a replacement, but he turned it down because he does not want to be typecast and believed it to be a similar role in Gladiator. Day-Lewis was offered the role for a second time, but declined again. Executive Producer Mark Ordesky saw Mortensen in a play. Mortensen's son, a fan of the book, convinced him to take the role. Mortensen read the book on the plane, received a crash course lesson in fencing from Bob Anderson and began filming the scenes on Weathertop. Mortensen became a hit with the crew by patching up his costume and carrying his "hero" sword around with him off-camera.
 Sean Astin as Samwise Gamgee: Better known as Sam, a hobbit gardener and Frodo's best friend. Astin, who had recently become a father, bonded with the 18-year-old Wood in a protective manner, which mirrored Sam's relationship with Frodo.
 Sean Bean as Boromir: A son of the Stewards of Gondor who journeys with the Fellowship towards Mordor. Bruce Willis, a fan of the book, expressed interest in the role, while Liam Neeson was sent the script, but passed.
 Billy Boyd as Peregrin Took: Better known as Pippin, an extremely foolish hobbit who is a distant cousin of Frodo and travels with the Fellowship on their journey to Mordor.
 Dominic Monaghan as Meriadoc Brandybuck: Better known as Merry, a distant cousin of Frodo. Monaghan was cast as Merry after auditioning for Frodo.
 John Rhys-Davies as Gimli: A dwarf warrior who accompanies the Fellowship to Mordor after they set out from Rivendell. Billy Connolly, who was considered for the part of Gimli, would later portray Dáin II Ironfoot in Peter Jackson's The Hobbit film trilogy. Rhys-Davies wore heavy prosthetics to play Gimli, which limited his vision, and eventually he developed eczema around his eyes. Rhys-Davies also played Gimli's father Glóin during the scene where the fellowship is forged.
 Orlando Bloom as Legolas: A prince of the elves' Woodland Realm and a skilled archer. Bloom initially auditioned for Faramir, who appears in the second film, a role which went to David Wenham.
 Liv Tyler as Arwen: An elf of Rivendell and Aragorn's lover. The filmmakers approached Tyler after seeing her performance in Plunkett & Macleane, and New Line Cinema leaped at the opportunity of having one Hollywood star in the film. Actress Helena Bonham Carter had expressed interest in the role. Tyler came to shoot on short occasions, unlike the rest of the actors. She was one of the last actors to be cast, on 25 August 1999.
 Cate Blanchett as Galadriel: The elven co-ruler of Lothlórien alongside her husband Celeborn. Lucy Lawless was considered for the role.
 Christopher Lee as Saruman the White: The fallen head of the Istari Order who succumbs to Sauron's will through his use of the palantír. Lee was a major fan of the book, and read it once a year. He had also met J. R. R. Tolkien. He originally auditioned for Gandalf, but was judged too old.
 Hugo Weaving as Elrond: The Elven-Lord of Rivendell who leads the Council of Elrond, which ultimately decides to destroy the Ring. David Bowie expressed interest in the role, but Jackson stated, "To have a famous, beloved character and a famous star colliding is slightly uncomfortable."
 Ian Holm as Bilbo Baggins: Frodo's uncle who gives him the Ring after he decides to retire to Rivendell. Holm previously played Frodo in a 1981 radio adaption of The Lord of the Rings, and was cast as Bilbo after Jackson remembered his performance. Sylvester McCoy, who would later play Radagast the Brown in The Hobbit, was contacted about playing the role, and was kept in place as a potential Bilbo for six months before Jackson went with Holm.
 Andy Serkis as Gollum : A wretched hobbit-like creature whose mind was poisoned by the Ring after bearing it for 500 years. This character appears briefly in the prologue. In Mordor, one can only hear his voice shouting and in Moria, only his eyes and his nose appear. Serkis was working on the 1999 six-episode Oliver Twist miniseries when his agent told him that Jackson wanted to approach him to play Gollum. Despite ultimately accepting the role, Serkis was initially doubtful about taking the part as one of his Oliver Twist fellow actors opined that it wasn't a good idea if his face wasn't going to appear onscreen, aside that Jackson was unsure if Gollum could be portrayed with motion-capture performance as they wished.

The cast also includes:

 Sala Baker as Sauron: The Dark Lord of Mordor and the Ring's true master, who manifests as an Eye after the destruction of his physical form.
 Marton Csokas as Celeborn the Wise: The Elven-Lord of Lothlórien and Galadriel's husband.
 Lawrence Makoare as Lurtz: The commander of Saruman's Uruk-Hai forces.
 Craig Parker as Haldir: The leader of the Galadhrim warriors guarding the border of Lothlórien.
 Mark Ferguson as Ereinion Gil-galad: The last Elven-King of the Noldor.
 Peter McKenzie as Elendil the Tall: The last High King of Arnor and Gondor.
 Harry Sinclair as Isildur: Elendil's son and Aragorn's ancestor who originally defeated Sauron.

Comparison to the source material

Jackson, Walsh and Boyens made numerous changes to the story, for purposes of pacing and character development. Jackson said his main desire was to make a film focused primarily on Frodo and the Ring, the "backbone" of the story. The prologue condenses Tolkien's backstory, in which The Last Alliance's seven-year siege of the Barad-dûr is a single battle, where Sauron is shown to explode, though Tolkien only said his spirit flees.

Some events and characters from the book are condensed or omitted (such is the case of Tom Bombadil) at the beginning of the film. The time between Gandalf leaving the Ring to Frodo and returning to reveal its inscription, which is 17 years in the book, is compressed for timing reasons. The filmmakers also decided to move the opening scenes of The Two Towers, the Uruk-hai ambush and Boromir's death, to the film's linear climax.

The tone of the Moria sequence was altered. In the book, following the defeat on the Caradhras road, Gandalf advocates the Moria road against the resistance of the rest of the Fellowship (save Gimli), suggesting "there is a hope that Moria is still free...there is even a chance that Dwarves are there," though no one seems to think this likely. Frodo proposes they take a company vote, but the discovery of Wargs on their trail forces them to accept Gandalf's proposal. They only realize the Dwarves are all dead once they reach Balin's tomb. The filmmakers chose instead for Gandalf to resist the Moria plan as a foreshadowing device. Gandalf says to Gimli he would prefer not to enter Moria, and Saruman is shown to be aware of Gandalf's hesitance, revealing an illustration of the Balrog in one of his books. The corpses of the dwarves are instantly shown as the Fellowship enter Moria. One detail that many critics commented upon is that, in the novel, Pippin tosses a mere pebble into the well in Moria ("They then hear what sounds like a hammer tapping in the distance"), whereas in the film, he knocks an entire skeleton in ("Next, the skeleton ... falls down the well, also dragging down a chain and bucket. The noise is incredible.").

When Frodo is struck by a Nazgûl at Weathertop, in the book, the elf Glorfindel rides him to Rivendell, whereas in the film, Arwen takes on this role.

Production

Development

Director Peter Jackson began working with Christian Rivers to storyboard the series in August 1997, as well as getting Richard Taylor and Weta Workshop to begin creating his interpretation of Middle-earth. Jackson told them to make Middle-earth as plausible and believable as possible, and to think of it in a historical manner.

In November, Alan Lee and John Howe became the film trilogy's primary conceptual designers, having had previous experience as illustrators for the book and various other tie-ins. Lee worked for the Art Department creating places such as Rivendell, Isengard, Moria, and Lothlórien, giving Art Nouveau and geometry influences to the Elves and Dwarves respectively. Though Howe contributed with Bag End and the Argonath, he focused on the design of the characters' armour, having studied it his entire life. Weta and the Art Department continued to design, with Grant Major turning the Art Department's designs into architecture, and Dan Hennah scouting locations. On 1 April 1999, Ngila Dickson joined the crew as costume designer. She and 40 seamstresses would create 19,000 costumes, 40 per version for the actor and their doubles, wearing them out for an impression of age.

Filming locations

Filming took place in various locations across New Zealand. A list of filming locations, sorted by appearance order in the film:

Special effects

The Fellowship of the Ring makes extensive use of digital, practical and make-up special effects. One notable illusion used in almost every scene involved setting a proper scale so that the characters all appear to be the correct height. A variety of techniques were used to depict the hobbits and Gimli the Dwarf as being of diminutive stature. Fortunately, John-Rhys Davies – who played Gimli – happens to be the correct height in proportion to the hobbit actors, so did not need to be filmed separately as a third height variation. Large- and small-scale doubles were used in certain scenes, while entire duplicates of certain sets (including Bag End in Hobbiton) were built at two different scales, so that the characters would appear to be the appropriate size. At one point in the film, Frodo runs along a corridor in Bag End, followed by Gandalf. Elijah Wood and Ian McKellen were filmed in separate versions of the same corridor, built at two different scales, and a fast camera pan conceals the edit between the two. Forced perspective was also employed, so that it would look as though the short hobbits were interacting with taller Men and Elves. Even the simple use of kneeling down, to the filmmakers' surprise, turned out to be an effective method in creating the illusion.

For the battle between the Last Alliance and Sauron's forces that begins the film, an elaborate CGI animation system, called MASSIVE, was developed by Stephen Regelous; it allowed thousands of individual animated characters, or "agents" in the program, to act independently. This lent the illusion of realism to the battle sequences. The "Making of" Lord of the Rings DVD reports some interesting initial problems: for instance, in the first execution of a battle between groups of characters, the wrong groups attacked each other. In another early demo, some of the warriors at the edge of the field could be seen running away. They were initially moving in the wrong direction, and had been programmed to keep running until they encountered an enemy.

The digital creatures were important due to Jackson's requirement of biological plausibility. Their surface texture was scanned from large maquettes before numerous digital details of their skeletons and muscles were added. In the case of the Balrog, Gray Horsfield created a system that copied recorded imagery of fire.

Score

James Horner turned down the offer to compose the score. The musical score for The Lord of the Rings films was composed by Howard Shore. It was performed by the New Zealand Symphony Orchestra, the London Philharmonic Orchestra, the London Voices, The London Oratory School Schola, and the Maori Samoan Choir, and featured several vocal soloists. Shore wrote almost four hours of finalized music for the film (of which just over three hours are used as underscore), featuring a number of non-orchestral instruments, and a large number (49–62) of leitmotives.

Two original songs, "Aníron" and the end title theme "May It Be", were composed and sung by Enya, who allowed her label, Reprise Records, to release the soundtrack to The Fellowship of the Ring and its two sequels. In addition to these, Shore composed "In Dreams", which was sung by Edward Ross of the London Oratory School Schola.

Release

Theatrical
The world premiere of The Fellowship of the Ring was held at the Odeon Leicester Square in London on 10 December 2001. It was released on Wednesday, 19 December 2001 internationally in most major territories on 10,000 screens. It opened in New Zealand on 20 December.

Marketing
A special featurette trailer was released in 2000. The trilogy sizzle reel was shown before Thirteen Days and the teaser trailer before Pearl Harbor. The theatrical trailer was attached with the television premiere of Angel and before Harry Potter and the Philosopher's Stone. Both trailers appeared as easter eggs on the Rush Hour 2 and Little Nicky DVD and VHS.

Home media
The Fellowship of the Ring was released on VHS and DVD on 6 August 2002. It was the best-selling DVD release at the time with 14.5 million copies being sold. This record was dethroned by Finding Nemo the following year.

Theatrical and extended release

On 12 November 2002, an extended edition was released on VHS and DVD, with 30 minutes of new material, added special effects and music, plus 19 minutes of fan-club credits, totaling to 228 minutes. The DVD set included four commentaries and over three hours of supplementary material.

On 29 August 2006, a limited edition of The Fellowship of the Ring was released on DVD. The set included both the film's theatrical and extended editions on a double-sided disc along with all-new bonus material.

Blu-ray edition

The theatrical Blu-ray version of The Lord of the Rings was released in the United States on 6 April 2010. There were two separate sets: one with digital copies and one without. The individual Blu-ray disc of The Fellowship of the Ring was released on 14 September 2010 with the same special features as the complete trilogy release, except there was no digital copy.

The extended Blu-ray editions were released in the US on 28 June 2011. This version has a runtime of 238 minutes (the extended editions include the names of all fan club members at the time of their release; the additional 9 minutes in the Blu-ray version are because of expanded member rolls, not any additional story material).

The Fellowship of the Ring was released in Ultra HD Blu-ray on 30 November 2020 in the United Kingdom and on 1 December 2020 in the United States, along with the other films of the trilogy, including both the theatrical and the extended editions of the films.

Reception

Box office

On its opening day, it grossed $18.2 million in the United States and Canada from 3,359 cinemas and $11.5 million in 13 countries, including $3 million from 466 screens in the United Kingdom. It grossed $75.1 million in its first five days in the United States and Canada, including $47.2 million on its opening weekend, placing it at number one at the US box office, setting a December opening record, beating Ocean's Eleven.

The film also opened at number one in 29 international markets and remained there for a second week in all but the Netherlands. It set a record opening day gross in Australia with $2.09 million from 405 screens, beating the record $1.3 million set by Star Wars: Episode I – The Phantom Menace. It had a record opening weekend in Germany with 1.5 million admissions and in Spain with a gross of $5.3 million from 395 screens. It also grossed a record $2.5 million in 15 days in New Zealand. This record would last for less than a decade before being surpassed by Avatar. In its first 15 days, it had grossed $183.5 million internationally and $178.7 million in the United States and Canada for a worldwide total of $362.2 million.

In its initial release, it went on to gross $313.4 million in the United States and Canada and $547.2 million in the rest of the world for a worldwide total of $860.5 million. Box Office Mojo estimates that the film sold over 54 million tickets in the US and Canada in its initial theatrical run. Following subsequent reissues, the film has grossed $316.1 million in the United States and Canada and $582.1 million in the rest of the world for a worldwide total of $898.2 million.

Critical response

On review aggregator Rotten Tomatoes, the film holds an approval rating of 91% based on 234 reviews, with an average rating of 8.2/10. The website's critics consensus reads, "Full of eye-popping special effects, and featuring a pitch-perfect cast, The Lord of the Rings: The Fellowship of the Ring brings J.R.R. Tolkien's classic to vivid life." Metacritic, which uses a weighted average, assigned the film a score of 92 out of 100 based on 34 critics, indicating "universal acclaim". Audiences polled by CinemaScore gave the film an average grade of "A−" on an A+ to F scale.

The Fellowship of the Ring was released to universal critical acclaim. Colin Kennedy for Empire gave the film five stars out of five, writing "Brooking no argument, history should quickly regard Peter Jackson’s The Fellowship of the Ring as the first instalment of the best fantasy epic in motion picture history... Putting formula blockbusters to shame, Fellowship is impeccably cast and constructed with both care and passion: this is a labour of love that never feels laboured. Emotional range and character depth ultimately take us beyond genre limitations..." Roger Ebert of the Chicago Sun-Times gave the film three out of four stars and stating that while it is not "a true visualization of Tolkien's Middle-earth", it is "a work for, and of, our times. It will be embraced, I suspect, by many Tolkien fans and take on aspects of a cult. It is a candidate for many Oscars. It is an awesome production in its daring and breadth, and there are small touches that are just right". USA Today also gave the film three out of four stars and wrote, "this movie version of a beloved book should please devotees as well as the uninitiated". In his review for The New York Times, Elvis Mitchell wrote, "The playful spookiness of Mr. Jackson's direction provides a lively, light touch, a gesture that doesn't normally come to mind when Tolkien's name is mentioned". Lisa Schwarzbaum for Entertainment Weekly gave the film an A grade and wrote "The cast take to their roles with becoming modesty, certainly, but Jackson also makes it easy for them: His Fellowship flows, never lingering for the sake of admiring its own beauty ... Every detail of which engrossed me. I may have never turned a page of Tolkien, but I know enchantment when I see it". In his review for the BBC, Nev Pierce gave the film four stars out of five, describing it as "Funny, scary, and totally involving", and wrote that Jackson turned "the book's least screen-worthy volume into a gripping and powerful adventure movie". In his review for The Guardian, Xan Brooks wrote "Rather than a stand-alone holiday blockbuster, The Fellowship of the Ring offers an epic act one", and commented that the ending was "closer in spirit to an art-house film than a popcorn holiday romp".

In his review for the New York Post, Lou Lumenick gave the film four stars out of four, praising Jackson's direction, the casting, the sets, and the score, and describing the film as "the three most exciting hours we've seen on a movie screen in years" and "easily one of the year's best movies". In her review for The Washington Post, Rita Kempley gave the film five stars out of five, and praised the cast, in particular, "Mortensen, as Strider, is a revelation, not to mention downright gorgeous. And McKellen, carrying the burden of thousands of years' worth of the fight against evil, is positively Merlinesque". Time magazine's Richard Corliss praised Jackson's work: "His movie achieves what the best fairy tales do: the creation of an alternate world, plausible and persuasive, where the young — and not only the young — can lose themselves. And perhaps, in identifying with the little Hobbit that could, find their better selves". In his review for The Village Voice, J. Hoberman wrote, "Peter Jackson's adaptation is certainly successful on its own terms". Rolling Stone magazine's Peter Travers wrote, "It's emotion that makes Fellowship stick hard in the memory... Jackson deserves to revel in his success. He's made a three-hour film that leaves you wanting more". A mixed review was written by Peter Bradshaw. Writing for The Guardian, he lauded the art direction and the visual look of the film, but he also commented "there is a strange paucity of plot complication, an absence of anything unfolding, all the more disconcerting because of the clotted and indigestible mythic back story that we have to wade through before anything happens at all". Overall, Bradshaw found the tone of the film too serious and self-important, and wrote "signing up to the movie's whole hobbity-elvish universe requires a leap of faith... It's a leap I didn't feel much like making – and, with two more movie episodes like this on the way, the credibility gap looks wider than ever." Jonathan Rosenbaum was also less positive about The Fellowship of the Ring: in his review for the Chicago Reader, he granted that the film was "full of scenic splendors with a fine sense of scale", but he commented that its narrative thrust seemed "relatively pro forma", and that he found the battle scenes boring.

Accolades

In 2002, the film won four Academy Awards from thirteen nominations. The winning categories were for Best Cinematography, Best Visual Effects, Best Makeup, and Best Original Score. It was also nominated for Best Actor in a Supporting Role (Ian McKellen), Best Art Direction, Best Director, Best Film Editing, Best Original Song (Enya, Nicky Ryan and Roma Ryan for "May It Be"), Best Picture, Best Sound (Christopher Boyes, Michael Semanick, Gethin Creagh and Hammond Peek), Best Costume Design and Best Adapted Screenplay.

The film won the 2002 Hugo Award for Best Dramatic Presentation. It also won Empire readers' Best Film award, as well as five BAFTAs, including Best Film, the David Lean Award for Best Direction, the Audience Award (voted for by the public), Best Special Effects, and Best Make-up. The film was nominated for an MTV Movie Award for Best Fight between Gandalf and Saruman.

In June 2008, AFI revealed its "10 Top 10"—the ten best films in ten "classic" American film genres—after polling over 1,500 people from the creative community. The Fellowship of the Ring was acknowledged as the second best film in the fantasy genre. The film was also listed as the 50th best film in the 2007 list AFI's 100 Years...100 Movies (10th Anniversary Edition).

References

External links

 
 
 
 
 
 

1
2000s English-language films
2000s American films
2001 fantasy films
2001 films
American epic films
American fantasy adventure films
BAFTA winners (films)
Best Film BAFTA Award winners
Films about dwarfs
Films directed by Peter Jackson
Films produced by Barrie M. Osborne
Films produced by Fran Walsh
Films produced by Peter Jackson
Films scored by Howard Shore
Films shot in New Zealand
Films that won the Academy Award for Best Makeup
Films that won the Best Original Score Academy Award
Films that won the Best Visual Effects Academy Award
Films using motion capture
Films whose cinematographer won the Best Cinematography Academy Award
Films whose director won the Best Direction BAFTA Award
Films with screenplays by Fran Walsh
Films with screenplays by Peter Jackson
Films with screenplays by Philippa Boyens
High fantasy films
Hugo Award for Best Dramatic Presentation winning works
Middle-earth (film franchise) films
Nebula Award for Best Script-winning works
New Line Cinema films
New Zealand epic films
New Zealand fantasy adventure films
United States National Film Registry films
WingNut Films films
2000s British films
Films produced by Tim Sanders (filmmaker)